The Iowa Hawkeyes football program is a college football team that represents the University of Iowa in the Big Ten Conference in the National Collegiate Athletic Association. The program has had 25 head coaches since organized football began in 1889. Iowa has played in over 1,200 games during its 127 seasons.

Key

Coaches
Statistics correct as of the end of the 2022 NCAA Division I FBS football season.

 Iowa won the Western Interstate University Football Association (WIUFA) conference championship in 1896.
 Iowa won the Missouri Valley Intercollegiate Athletic Association (MVIAA) conference championship in 1907.

Notes

References

Lists of college football head coaches

Iowa sports-related lists